Zobia is a village in the Bas-Uélé province of the Democratic Republic of the Congo. Zobia Gauche was a station on the defunct Vicicongo line, a railway.

Location

Zobia is in the Bas-Uélé province, Democratic Republic of the Congo.
It is in the Bambesa Territory.
It is on the right side of the Bima River, a left tributary of the Uele River.
It is on the RP415 road from Titulé to the west to Poko to the east.
Zobia has a general hospital.
As of 2007 the Bambesa diamond trading center was located in Zobia.

Colonial era

Zobia was an administrative center in the colonial era, seat of Zobia Territory.
In 1918 there were three chiefdoms of Makere people in the territory.

Former railway

The main axis of the Vicicongo line built by the Société des Chemins de Fer Vicinaux du Congo ran east from Andoma (Liénart) through Benge to Zobia Gauche, through Zobia Droite and on to Mawa.
The  section from Andoma to Zobia opened in December 1932, and the  section from Zobia to Isiro opened on 31 December 1934.

Notes

Sources

Populated places in Bas-Uélé